Frank Brown may refer to:

Frank Brown (governor) (1846–1920), governor of Maryland
Frank Herbert Brown (1868–1959), English journalist 
Frank Clyde Brown (1870–1943), American folklorist and university administrator
Frank Edward Brown (1908–1988), American archaeologist
Frank Brown (alpine skier) (1937–2016), American Olympic skier
Frank Brown (footballer, born 1890) (1890–?), English footballer
Frank Brown (cyclist) (1890–1969), Canadian Olympic cyclist
Frank Chouteau Brown (1876–1947), American architect
Frank Brown (Australian footballer) (1887–1928), Australian rules footballer
Francis Harold Brown (1943–2017), American geologist and geochemist
Frank Brown (entertainer) (1858–1943), clown, acrobat and circus entrepreneur in Argentina
Frank Brown (journalist) (born ), American journalist
Frank J. Brown (1956–2020), African-American visual artist
Frank A. Brown Jr. (1908–1983), American researcher of biological rhythms
Frank London Brown (1927–1962), American author, journalist, and activist

See also
Frank Brown Park, an outdoor recreation facility in Panama City Beach, Florida
Franklin Browne (1873–1946), English cricketer
Francis Brown (disambiguation)
Frank Browne (disambiguation)